Hooker's Journal of Botany and Kew Garden Miscellany was a scientific journal edited by Sir William Hooker that was published in nine volumes between 1849 and 1857.

External links
 Hooker's Journal of Botany and Kew Garden Miscellany. London : Reeve, Benham, and Reeve, 1849–1857. (9 volumes)
 Biodiversity Heritage Library profile
 Scan of journal pages

Botany journals
Publications established in 1849
Publications disestablished in 1857
English-language journals
1849 establishments in England